Timothy Giles Paxman CMG LVO (born 15 November 1951) is a British diplomat who was Ambassador to Mexico between 2005 and 2009 and then Ambassador to Spain between 2009 and 2013.

Career
Paxman became Ambassador to Spain on 19 October 2009. He was appointed Companion of the Order of St Michael and St George (CMG) in the 2013 New Year Honours "for services to UK interests in Spain and Mexico." He was replaced by Simon Manley in October 2013.

Personal life
Paxman is married to Ségolène Cayol, with whom he has three daughters. He is a Lieutenant of the Royal Victorian Order. He is the younger brother of broadcaster Jeremy Paxman.

References
PAXMAN, (Timothy) Giles, Who's Who 2013, A & C Black, 2013; online edn, Oxford University Press, Dec 2012
HE Mr Giles Paxman, CMG, LVO Authorised Biography – Debrett’s People of Today

1951 births
Living people
People educated at Malvern College
Alumni of New College, Oxford
École nationale d'administration alumni
Ambassadors of the United Kingdom to Mexico
Ambassadors of the United Kingdom to Spain
Companions of the Order of St Michael and St George
Lieutenants of the Royal Victorian Order